Anne-Elizabeth Stone, commonly known as Eliza Stone, (born December 31, 1990) is an American sabre fencer. Her results include an individual bronze medal at the 2018 World Fencing Championships and a team gold medal in the 2014 World Championships.

Career
Stone grew up fencing with her younger brother and sister in Chicago. She first took ballet lessons. She switched to fencing at the age of ten after her father saw a flier for a fencing club at a pizza parlor and thought it would be a good sport for his children. All three ended up fencing for Princeton University.

Stone joined the US national team in the 2012–13 season, during which she took the silver medal in the Pan American Championships after being defeated in the final by two-time Olympic champion Mariel Zagunis. In the 2013 World Championships at Budapest, she was stopped in the second round by Matylda Ostojska of Poland. In the team event, the United States defeated Belarus and Azerbaijan before being stopped in the semi-finals by Russia. They then topped Italy to earn the bronze medal.

The next season, Stone climbed  her first World Cup podium in Dakar. A second bronze followed in the Moscow Grand Prix. In the 2014 World Championships at Kazan, Stone was stopped in the third round by Poland's Aleksandra Socha. In the team event, the United States prevailed over Kazakhstan, China, then Ukraine and met France in the final. They won 45-39 to take the gold medal.

At the 2018 World Fencing Championships in Wuxi, Stone finished with a bronze medal for her best individual result to date, falling in the semi-finals to eventual champion Sofia Pozdniakova. In January 2019, she achieved the No. 1 individual ranking in the United States for Women's Saber. In June 2019 she won her first gold medal at the Pan-American Games, and as a result achieved a career high ranking of 5th in the world.

In 2013 Stone obtained a BA in political science from Princeton University.

She qualified to represent the United States in fencing at the 2020 Olympics in Tokyo. She competed individually and in the team event alongside teammates Mariel Zagunis, Dagmara Wozniak, and Francesca Russo.

References

External links

Profile at the US Fencing Federation

1990 births
Living people
American female sabre fencers
Sportspeople from Chicago
Pan American Games medalists in fencing
Pan American Games gold medalists for the United States
Fencers at the 2019 Pan American Games
World Fencing Championships medalists
Medalists at the 2019 Pan American Games
Fencers at the 2020 Summer Olympics
Olympic fencers of the United States
21st-century American women